Mirdha is an Indian surname found in Jodhpur Marwar region of Rajasthan, India.

Notable people with surname include:
 Ram Niwas Mirdha, son of Baldev Ram Mirdha
 Nathuram Mirdha, nephew of Baldev Ram Mirdha
 Bhanu Prakash Mirdha, son of Nathuram Mirdha
 Jyoti Mirdha, granddaughter of Nathuram Mirdha

Jat clans of Rajasthan
Indian surnames